The Southern Festival of Books is an annual literary festival in Nashville, Tennessee. It was established in 1989. The 2019 festival included panel discussions and book signings with "more than 200 authors."

References

External links
sofestofbooks.org
Southern Festival of Books at www.humanitiestennessee.org
Southern Festival of Books on C-SPAN

Book fairs in the United States
Events in Nashville, Tennessee
Festivals established in 1989
Literary festivals in the United States
1989 establishments in Tennessee